Suardo is a surname. Notable people with the surname include:

Giacomo Suardo (1883–1947), Italian lawyer
Innico Maria Guevara-Suardo (1744–1814), Italian catholic religious